Hopewell is a small unincorporated community in northern Warren Township, Jefferson County, Ohio, United States. Its FIPS place code is 36302, and its elevation is 1200 feet above sea level. The community is part of the Weirton–Steubenville, WV-OH Metropolitan Statistical Area.

Public education in the community of Hopewell is provided by the Buckeye Local School District.

References

Unincorporated communities in Jefferson County, Ohio
Unincorporated communities in Ohio